Nicolaus Richter de Vroe (born 1 February 1955) is a German composer and violinist.

Life 
Born in Halle (Saale), Richter de Vroe besuchte die . He studied composition and violin at the Hochschule für Musik Carl Maria von Weber Dresden from 1972 to 1973. From 1973 to 1978, he then studied violin with Vladimir Malinin at the Tchaikovsky Conservatory in Moscow. From 1980 to 1983, he completed his studies in composition with Friedrich Goldmann at the Academy of Arts, Berlin. He also attended seminars in electronic music led by Georg Katzer.

From 1978 to 1980, he worked as a chamber musician and in 1982 he co-founded the Ensemble für Neue Musik Berlin. In 1980, he was engaged as violinist at the Staatskapelle Berlin. Since 1988, he has worked with the Bavarian Radio Symphony Orchestra. In 1989, he founded the "Xsemble München". In 1996, he was a co-initiator of the Munich Society for New Music and a guest of the Goethe-Institut of Buenos Aires, Kyoto and Prague. He is commissioner of the Bavarian Radio Symphony Orchestra for the concert series Musica Viva. In 2008, he became a member of the Sächsische Akademie der Künste.

Further reading 
 Richter de Vroe, Nicolaus. In Axel Schniederjürgen (ed.): Kürschners Musiker-Handbuch. 5th edition K. G. Saur Verlag, Munich 2006, .

References

External links 
 
 
 Website

German classical guitarists
20th-century classical composers
German composers
1955 births
Living people
People from Halle (Saale)